The Fairbourne Railway (Welsh: Rheilffordd y Friog) is a  gauge miniature railway running for  from the village of Fairbourne on the Mid-Wales coast, alongside the beach to the end of a peninsula at Barmouth Ferry railway station, where there is a connection with the Barmouth Ferry across the Mawddach estuary to the seaside resort of Barmouth.

History

The line has provided a service between Fairbourne village and Penrhyn Point since its opening in 1895 as a  narrow gauge horse-drawn construction tramway. It was converted in 1916 to  gauge, and again to its present gauge in 1986. Originally built to carry building materials, the railway has carried holidaymakers for over a hundred years. At its peak in the 1970s it was carrying in excess of 70,000 passengers a year.

The early days – Fairbourne Tramway

Following the construction of the Cambrian Coast Line in 1865 and the completion of the Barmouth Bridge in 1867 there were lavish schemes to develop the area for tourism, the area being easily accessible to day-trippers and weekend visitors from the Midlands.

There were several horse-drawn construction tramways in the area serving the Henddol Quarry above the neighbouring village of Friog. The tramway that was used to construct the Fairbourne village soon introduced passenger cars to transport people to the ferry station.

The pioneering days – Fairbourne Miniature Railway

The line was converted to a  gauge steam railway in 1916 by Wenman Joseph Bassett-Lowke of Narrow Gauge Railways Ltd (NGR). They were keen to promote tourism in the area after the failure of the Arthog scheme in the early 1900s. The railway played an important part in the development of the  gauge railways in the UK. Services were operated by Bassett-Lowke Class 10 locomotive Prince Edward of Wales designed by Henry Greenly and passengers were conveyed in four open top carriages.

The railway had mixed fortunes during the inter war years and went through a series of changes in ownership. At one time it was leased to the ferrymen. The railway experienced motive power problems and at one stage experimented with dual gauge track after  purchasing an  gauge locomotive. This was a model of a GNR Stirling 4-2-2. A third rail was laid as far as the Golf Course.

The line closed in 1940 after operating its final year with Whippit Quick, a Lister 'Railtruck' petrol locomotive, as the steam locomotive Count Louis was out of service.

The Wilkins era – 1947–1984
The railway was rescued by a consortium of businessmen from the Midlands in 1946 and after rebuilding, was reopened by 1947. The line's owner John Charles Wilkins (of Wilkins & Mitchell, Darlaston), funded the redevelopment of the railway and the purchase of new steam locomotives. The line's heyday was in the 1960s and early 1970s but the advent of mass foreign holidays meant there was a steady decline in passenger numbers during the 1970s and 1980s.

The Ellerton era – 1984–1995 

Towards the end of the Wilkins era, the condition of the Fairbourne Railway was in serious decline and in much need of improvements. It was, subsequently, put up for sale. It was bought in 1984 by the Ellerton family and underwent dramatic changes to the infrastructure which included construction of a new station at Fairbourne and the re-gauging to 12¼ inches in 1986 to accommodate the four new steam locomotives introduced. Most of the  gauge locomotives left the site. Two of the new locomotives had run on the Réseau Guerlédan Chemin de Fer Touristique in Brittany, France in 1978. All four steam locomotives are half sized replicas of narrow gauge engines: Yeo, Sherpa, Beddgelert and Russell. Of the extant  gauge locomotives only Sylvia (rebuilt as Lilian Walter) remained. Most of the  gauge locomotives are still intact and have found homes on lines around the world.

In 1990 the railway built their first steam locomotive, Number 24, a replica of a locomotive from the Sandy River & Rangeley Lakes Railroad in Maine. The locomotive has since left the line and now operates on the Cleethorpes Coast Light Railway in Lincolnshire.

The Ellerton era was, no doubt, the most controversial of the railway's history. After purchase, the extensive transformation required substantial capital, much of it, could never be recouped due to a combination of cheap overseas holidays reducing passenger numbers and gross overspend. It could be argued that the Ellerton family saved the railway from permanent closure. Many applauded the transformation of the old railway into its current guise, including the Prince of Wales, who landed the owner, John, with the coveted Prince or Wales Award for Architecture. For some, the transformations were too pronounced, particularly that of the regauging of the line from 15 in to 12¼ inches, and oddly enough, the name change from Fairbourne Railway to Fairbourne & Barmouth Narrow Gauge Railway. For others, it sparked an era of a brand new face of a revitalised Fairbourne Railway, which, to this today, is reflected by the changes put in place during this period.

The Ellerton family sold the railway during 1995, after which, the railway reverted to the name of Fairbourne Railway.

Present: 1995 onwards 
Professor Tony Atkinson and Dr Roger Melton bought the line in April 1995, they and their wives Mrs Maureen Atkinson and Mrs Amanda Melton being appointed directors. There was considerable investment in the railway to improve reliability of the locomotives and the quality of the track, and a new attraction, the Rowen Centre, was set up at Fairbourne station. In 2007 some of the displays were changed to accommodate a large G scale model railway which is gradually being added to and improved by local model engineers.

In 2008 ownership of the railway was transferred to a charity, the North Wales Coast Light Railway Limited (Registered number 1127261). Professor Atkinson subsidised the railway's operation but the subsidy was withdrawn after he died on 19 June 2011, leaving the railway's future in doubt. With reductions in staff and by the encouragement of donations the railway has been able to continue in operation.

Preservation Society
Like most heritage railways, the Fairbourne Railway has an active volunteer society: Fairbourne Railway Preservation Society (formerly the Fairbourne Railway Supporter's Association). The society is actively involved with the running of services and maintaining the locomotives, rolling stock, stations and track work.

Stations and facilities

Operation

Steam Locomotives haul most of the passenger services, some of the locomotives are approximately half-size replicas of famous narrow gauge prototype locomotives such as the Class B Tanks from the Darjeeling Himalayan Railway and the Manning Wardle Tanks of the Lynton and Barnstaple Railway.

References

Bibliography

Books

 
 Buck, Stan; Siân and Katie - The Twining Sisters, Siân Project Group, 1995
 
 
 
 
 
 Fairbourne Railway; Souvenir Guide Book, 2005.

Magazines

 One Foot Between The Rails published quarterly by the Fairbourne Railway Preservation Society.

Multimedia

 Tracks in the Sand The Story of the Fairbourne Railway – a film by Eric Montague was released in 2007. A Century of Steam was released in 2016 recording the Fairbourne Centenary of Steam Gala. These DVD's are also available from The Fairbourne Railway website.

External links

 
 Return to the Ferry photo gallery
 Fairbourne Railway Fotopic Gallery
  Return to the Ferry Website: A pictorial history of the 15 inch gauge Fairbourne Railway
 Maps and photos of: Fairbourne -  and Barmouth Ferry - 
 The Fairbourne Steam Railway (The Ellerton Years 1984-95)

 
15 in gauge railways in Wales
12¼ in gauge railways in Wales
2 ft gauge railways in Wales
Miniature railways in the United Kingdom
Railway lines opened in 1895
Heritage railways in Gwynedd
Articles containing video clips